Cançons i danses (sing. Cançó i dansa - Catalan; English: Songs and Dances; each originally published singly under the Spanish title Canción y Danza
) is the title of a collection of 15 pieces by Federico Mompou, written between 1918 and 1972.  All were written for the piano, except No. 13 for guitar, and No. 15 for organ.

Pieces
Each piece consists of an introductory slow Cançó, followed by a more animated Dansa in a related key but not necessarily in the same time signature.  They are mostly based on existing  Catalan folk tunes, although some of them are original works.  Each takes between 3 and 5 minutes to play.   

The Cançons i danses were not written as a set, but as discrete pieces over a 55-year span.  Cançó i dansa No. 1 is one of Mompou's best known works, and has been arranged for various combinations of instruments.  No. 6 is also very well known.  

Many of them have been recorded individually, by pianists such as Arthur Rubinstein, Arturo Benedetti Michelangeli, Stephen Hough, Stanislas Niedzielski, Artur Pizarro, Neil Galanter and others.  The complete collection has been recorded by the composer himself, Alicia de Larrocha, Martin Jones, Jordi Masó, Gustavo Romero, and Peter Fletcher (in his own arrangements for guitar).

List of Cançons i danses

Sources
 entre88teclas.es
  MOMPOU, F.: Piano Music, Vol. 1 (Maso) Naxos 8.554332
 PRODigital Records – Program notes
 Quotesque.net
 Catalan piano music Mompou Canço i dansa no. 6

Notes

External links
 

Compositions by Federico Mompou
Compositions for solo piano
Compositions for guitar
Compositions for organ
Spanish folk music